Tol-e Semengi (also Romanized as Tol-e Semengī; also known as Tal-e Sīmīng) is a village in Hangam Rural District, in the Central District of Qir and Karzin County, Fars Province, Iran. At the 2006 census, its population was 23, in 6 families.

References 

Populated places in Qir and Karzin County